National Treasures – The Complete Singles is a compilation album by the Welsh alternative rock band Manic Street Preachers, released on 31 October 2011. It is the band's third compilation album, after Forever Delayed: Manic Street Preachers, The Greatest Hits (2002), and the B-sides/rarities collection Lipstick Traces (A Secret History of Manic Street Preachers) (2003). The compilation features one new recording, a cover of The The's "This Is the Day", which was issued as a single on 18 September 2011. The compilation reached number 10 on the UK Album Chart in November 2011.

Background

National Treasures includes most of the band's singles from 1991's "Motown Junk" to 2011's "This Is the Day". Despite the "complete singles" title, National Treasures does not contain every Manic Street Preachers single. Notable omissions are the band's very first single, "Suicide Alley" (1988), "Strip It Down" from the New Art Riot EP (1990), for which the band's first promotional video was made, and "You Love Us (Heavenly Version)" (1991). For singles originally released as double-A sides, only one song is included: therefore from "Love's Sweet Exile/Repeat" (1992) and "Faster/P.C.P." (1994), only "Love's Sweet Exile" and "Faster" are included.

The collection also excludes singles that were not chart-eligible, such as the fanzine-only single "UK Channel Boredom" (1990), singles released in other territories such as the Japanese only singles Further Away (1996) and Nobody Loved You (1998), and singles released only as limited-edition vinyl, CDs and downloads (1991's "Feminine Is Beautiful", 2005's God Save the Manics EP, 2007's "Underdogs" and "The Ghosts of Christmas", and 2008's "Umbrella"). In addition, National Treasures contains nothing from the Manics' ninth studio album, Journal for Plague Lovers (2009) because officially, no singles were released from that album (although the track "Jackie Collins Existential Question Time" did receive airplay). For a feature article in the 4 October 2011 issue of the NME, to promote National Treasures, Manic Street Preachers James Dean Bradfield, Nicky Wire, and Sean Moore were asked to rank a list of 40 of their singles: the 38 tracks from National Treasures plus "Suicide Alley" and the New Art Riot EP track, "Strip It Down".

Release

National Treasures was released in three formats: a standard 2CD edition, a deluxe 2CD/1DVD edition, and a Super Deluxe edition. The Super Deluxe edition contains 7" reproductions of each of these singles, as well as New Art Riot. A 14 track "Selected Singles" sampler was also released as a vinyl with Q Magazine containing an exclusive track, a cover of John Cale's "The Endless Plain of Fortune".

The album is certified Gold in the UK, it also charted in Ireland, Spain and in Japan. The album was promoted with a show at the O2 Arena.

Reception 

The album received a highly favourable response from critics and it was seen as a unique opportunity to hear all the band's singles and see their history. On Metacritic the album has a score of 95 out of 100, based on 8 critics, which indicates "universal acclaim".

AllMusic awarded the album with a rating of 4.5 out of 5, saying that: "Arriving roughly ten years after their first hits compilation, 2002’s Forever Delayed, 2011’s National Treasures: The Complete Singles has another decade to cover so it’s perfectly sensible that the collection spans two discs as it diligently marches through almost every single Manic Street Preachers released during their first 20 years." (...) "but it’s the first disc, containing the songs they recorded with Richey Edwards and the music they made immediately after his disappearance, that makes the strongest case for their legacy." Q and Uncut gave the album a rating of 5 out of 5. Digital Spy also gave the album a perfect score and said that: "Against all odds, Manic Street Preachers are British pop's ultimate survivors. Proof that in the long run it's far better to be ridiculed by some than meekly accepted by all. They've been laughed at, battered, bruised, indulged, celebrated, diminished, reborn, accepted, mocked, hated and loved all over again. Iconoclasts become pop superstars. Misfits turned national treasures."

Recognition 

The album was voted by NME magazine as the best re issue of 2011, beating Nirvana's deluxe and super deluxe edition of Nevermind to the top spot.

Live 

On 17 December 2011, the group performed 'A Night of National Treasures' at O2 Arena in London to celebrate the bands 25 years to date, and enter into a period of hiatus where the eleventh album was written. The band performed all the 38 singles in one show, with around 20.000 people attending the show. It featured guests, like Nina Persson from The Cardigans who sings with the band on the single Your Love Alone Is Not Enough and Gruff Rhys from Super Furry Animals who sang with the band that night on the track Let Robeson Sing. The Guardian reviewed the show, giving it a score of 5 out of 5, and stated that: "the Manics can sell out an arena gig at which they perform all 38 of their singles (as compiled on the recent album National Treasures) proves they were right about one thing all along: they really are a stadium band."

A DVD featuring the music videos to the tracks featured on the album is available in the deluxe edition. It also contains extra bonus content including alternate videos for You Love Us and Autumnsong and the video for "Jackie Collins Existential Question Time".

Track listing

Charts and certifications

Weekly charts

Year-end charts

Certifications

References

External links 

National Treasures – The Complete Singles at YouTube (streamed copy where licensed)
 
 

Manic Street Preachers compilation albums
2011 compilation albums